James White, nicknamed "Babe", was an American Negro league second baseman in the 1920s.

White played for the Pittsburgh Keystones and St. Louis Stars in 1922. In 10 recorded games, he posted eight hits in 21 plate appearances.

References

External links
 and Seamheads

Year of birth missing
Year of death missing
Place of birth missing
Place of death missing
Pittsburgh Keystones players
St. Louis Stars (baseball) players
Baseball second basemen